Lambarek Boumaarafi (born 1966 in Meskiana) is a former second lieutenant of the special intervention group (GIS) of the Algerian Army who, on 29 June 1992 in Annaba, killed the Algerian president Mohamed Boudiaf.

Twenty days after the assassination, a commission of inquiry named immediately after the assassination made its finding: it was a conspiracy. In support of this thesis, the six members of the commission, while noting that Boumaarafi had no "profile" of a kamikaze acting on his own initiative, noted the criminal negligence of security services which facilitated the task of the killer.

He was part of a special operations group (GIS) dependent on Département du Renseignement et de la Sécurité (DRS) responsible for various law enforcement operations. A brigade which, theoretically, was not charged with ensuring the safety of President Boudiaf.

This situation, and its confusing explanations, have cast doubt on the reasons that led his superiors to assign him that day where as the protection of the Algerian president.

During the mutiny of Algiers Serkadji prison, in June 1995, that killed 100 people, including 96 prisoners, his disappearance was discussed. It was a false rumor. He is still in prison, and in June 2007, his father says that he was not the assassin.

See also 
 Larbi Belkheir Minister of the Interior at the time of the murder
 Mohamed Mediène at the head of Département du Renseignement et de la Sécurité since 1990

References

Assassins of heads of state
Algerian prisoners and detainees
1966 births
Living people
Algerian People's National Army
People from Oum El Bouaghi Province